Banalakshmi or "Vanalakshmi Unmesh Samiti" is a Krishi Ashram and a small NGO in the Birbhum district of West Bengal. It is located near to the Santiniketan, the education centre set up by Rabindranath Tagore. It is connected by a highway to Ilambazar and Bolpur. The bus stop name is Banabhila. The Choupahari sal forests or commonly known as Ilambazar forests  starts from here.   Address is Vanalakshmi Unmesh Samiti, Banabhila, P.O. Dwaranda (via Sriniketan P.O.), Birbhum-731236.  It is around 13/14 km towards Ilambazar from Shantiniketan. Contact Numbers are  +919434233376 and +919434557527.

History
The word 'Banalakshmi' literally means the richness (Lakshmi) of forest (Bana) (nature in general). It is the brainchild of Niranjan Sanyal who first conceived the idea of a natural paradise on barren lands of Birbhum in 1963. The idea was that it would evolve like an ecosphere—bettering the life of people by optimum utilization of natural resources. In 1964 Doc. Parbati Bhattacharya had joined with his mission and devoted her life to Banalakshmi. There were two others too, who were inspired by Niranjan babu. Sumitra Sinha from Vishwabharati University in neighbouring Santiniketan and Kannan Pal, a trained nurse from Kundagaon  (near Jagdalpur) in undivided Madhya Pradesh joined Banalakshmi  within a few years time. Since its inception, when it was completely devoid of any vegetation, it has been continuously growing and today it is a large green reserve and a center for rural development.

Vegetation
It is spread over an estimated area of 40 bigha (around 13 acres). It has vegetation grown on laterite soil which is the abundant red soil variety found in Birbhum. It has large forested tracts, orchards of various fruits—like mango and guava—and multiple crop cultivation the year round. The place is admirable for its scenic beauty. The road leading to Banalakshmi is also lined by dense to sporadic occurrence of tropical deciduous trees like sal and eucalyptus.

Economy
It is a center of a small cottage industry. Various products like honey, squash and handicrafts are prepared and sold. It is also an attractive tourist destination in the district.

External links
 For details about Banalakshmi see the article on "Of Forests" by Dr. Rina Mukherjee
 Banalakshmi Blog

Tourist attractions in West Bengal
Birbhum district